Kanchipurna was a twelfth century Vaishnavite acharya and one of the early teachers of Ramanuja. He is also known as ThiruKachchi Nambigal.

Life
When Ramanuja and his guru Yadava Prakaasa parted ways due to their differences in interpreting the Vedic literature, Ramanuja became a devotee of the Varadaraja Perumal temple in Kanchi. It was during his time here that he met Kanchipurna, a fellow devotee. Ramanuja met with Kanchipurna regularly and soon Ramanuja decided that he would become Kanchipurna's disciple. When he approached Kanchipurna about this, Kanchipurna politely refused as he did not belong to the same caste as Ramanuja and was lower in the social ladder when compared to Ramanuja. After this Kanchipurna left for Tirupati to worship Lord Venkateswara and would return only after six months. When he finally came back, it was through him that Lord Varadaraja conveyed his wish to Ramanuja. Accordingly Kanchipurna advised Ramanuja that it was the Lord's wish that he leave for Srirangam and find solace in Sri Mahapurna, another Vaishnavite acharya.

See also
Backward-caste Hindu Saints
Hindu reform movements
Vaishnavism

References

External links
Ramanuja and Kanchipurna

Medieval Hindu religious leaders
12th-century Indian philosophers
11th-century Indian philosophers
Indian Hindu spiritual teachers
Indian Vaishnavites
Sri Vaishnava religious leaders
People from Kanchipuram district
Vedanta
Vaishnava saints